Melocactus glaucescens is a species of plant in the family Cactaceae. It is endemic to Brazil.  Its natural habitats are rocky areas and hot deserts. It is threatened by habitat loss.

Melocactus glaucescens is identified by its glaucous appearance and its often whitish-yellow cephalium. The color of its cephalium varies slightly based on population.

References

Flora of Brazil
glaucescens
Critically endangered plants
Taxonomy articles created by Polbot